The Scottish Deerhound, or simply the Deerhound, is a large breed of sighthound, once bred to hunt the red deer by coursing. In outward appearance, the Scottish Deerhound is similar to the Greyhound, but larger and more heavily boned with a rough-coat.

History 
The Hilton of Cadboll Stone dates from around 1,200 years ago, and depicts at the bottom of the panel a deer that is being chased by two large dogs and two armed horsemen. However, systematic zooarchaeology and genetics have yet to show any connection between those symbolic representations of dog types and the modern breed, which only became widely known as the Scottish Deerhound related to English regional greyhounds, such as the Highland greyhound in the early 19th century. The Deerhound was in earlier times believed to be descended from old Gaelic hounds, and therefore closely related to the Irish Wolfhound, it was in fact the major foundation breed in the late 19th century of the modern Irish Wolfhound.

The Deerhound was bred to hunt red deer by coursing and deer-stalking until the end of the 19th century. With modern rifles and smaller deer-forests, slower tracking dogs were preferred to fast and far-running Deerhounds. In coursing deer, a single Deerhound or a pair was brought as close as possible to red deer, then released to run one of them down by speed, which if successful would happen within a few minutes — rarely were there successful sustained chases.

With the eventual demise of the clan systems in Scotland, these hunting dogs became sporting animals for landowners and the nobility, but were also bred and hunted with by common folk when feasible. As fast and silent hunters they made quick work of any game the size of a hare or larger and were highly regarded by nobility and poachers alike. One of the most precarious times in the breed's history seems to have been towards the end of the nineteenth century, when many of the large Scottish estates were split into small estates for sporting purposes, and few then kept Deerhounds. The new fashion was for stalking and shooting, which required only a tracking dog to follow the wounded animal, using a collie or similar breed. Although a few estates still employed Deerhounds for their original work, the breed was left in the hands of a few enthusiasts who made them a show breed.

Teddy Roosevelt wrote that some Canadian and American hunters used "the greyhound, whether the smooth-haired, or the rough-coated Scotch deer-hound" on the wolf and deer Dr. Q van Hummell also remarks on his Deerhound pack being used on timber wolves and coyotes.
In Australia, Deerhounds and their cross-breeds such as the Kangaroo Dog have historically been used to hunt the kangaroo as well as wild boar, modern descriptions of such hunts with Deerhounds on kangaroo and emu have been recorded by Kenneth Cassels.

Description 

In outward appearance, the Scottish Deerhound is similar to the Greyhound, but larger and more heavily boned. However, Deerhounds have a number of characteristics that set them apart. While not as fast as a Greyhound on a smooth, firm surface, once the going gets rough or heavy they can outrun a Greyhound. The environment in which they worked, the cool, often wet, and hilly Scottish Highland glens, contributed to the larger, rough-coated appearance of the breed. The Deerhound is closely related to the Irish wolfhound and was a contributor to that breed when it was created at the end of the 19th century.

The Scottish Deerhound resembles a rough-coated greyhound. It is however, larger in size and bone. It has small, dark "rose" ears which are soft and folded back against the head unless held semi-erect in excitement.

The harsh, wiry coat in modern dogs is only seen in self-coloured various shades of gray (blue-gray is preferred). Historically, Deerhounds also could be seen with true brindle, yellow, and red fawn coats, or combinations as recorded in the now oldest & most original breed standard, that of the AKC. 19th century Scottish paintings tend to indicate these colours were associated with a wire haired coat, but, with show breeders preferring a dark, longer coat, these genes now appear to be lost. The geneticist R. Jödicke: "During the 20th century the Deerhound evolved to a single-coloured breed by selection for a grey coat. Some other coat colours are documented in historical sources but have definitely been lost (Jödicke 1982). The recent colour of adult Deerhounds shows little variation. i.e. in the degree of darkness of the grey colour and the occurrence of a fawn shade. Altogether the Deerhound must be characterized as the breed with the most uniform colouration within all sighthounds". A white chest and toes are allowed, and a slight white tip to the tail; a white blaze on the head or a white collar are not accepted.

The head is long, skull flat, with little stop and a tapering muzzle. The eyes are dark, dark brown or hazel in colour. The teeth should form a level, complete scissor bite. The long straight or curved tail, well covered with hair, should almost reach the ground.

Temperament

The Scottish Deerhound is gentle and extremely friendly. The breed is famed for being docile and eager to please, with a bearing of gentle dignity. It is however a true sighthound which has been selected for generations to pursue game; consequently, most Deerhounds will be eager to chase.

The Deerhound needs considerable exercise when young to develop properly and to maintain its health and condition. That does not mean it needs a large house to live in; however it should have regular access to free exercise in a large fenced or otherwise "safe" area. Deerhounds should not be raised with access only to leash walking (or any form of "forced" exercise) or a small yard, this would be detrimental to their health and development as their bones grow very quickly and the young dogs need to play and rest according to their instincts.

Young Deerhounds can sometimes, depending on the individual, be quite destructive especially when they are not given sufficient exercise; however, the average adult Deerhound may want to spend most of the day stretched out on the floor or a couch, sleeping. They do require a stimulus, preferably another Deerhound, and a large area to exercise properly and frequently. They are gentle and docile indoors and are generally good around company and children. However, due to their size, they require supervision with young children.

Health

Longevity for this breed, according to a US health survey, is 8.4 years for males and 8.9 years for females, and a UK survey puts the average at 8.3 and median at 8.6. The serious health issues in the breed include cardiomyopathy; osteosarcoma; bloat; stomach or splenic torsion, called Gastric dilatation volvulus; cystinuria and some bleeding or clotting disorders. See current health studies.

Like other sighthounds, deerhounds have unique anatomical and physiological features likely due to intentional selection for hunting by speed and sight. Laboratory studies have established reference intervals for haematology and serum biochemical profiles in Deerhounds, some of which are shared by all sighthounds, and some of which may be unique to this breed.

Notable Scottish Deerhounds

 "Dusk": one of a couple (including "Dawn"), a wedding gift to the Danish writer Karen Blixen a.k.a. Isak Dinesen and her husband Bror von Blixen-Finecke during her years in Kenya, frequently referenced in Blixen's work and letters, with whom she can be seen in several photos, and represented in the feature film Out of Africa.
 Maida, Sir Walter Scott's dog
 Foxcliffe Hickory Wind

See also
 Dogs portal
 List of dog breeds
 List of domesticated Scottish breeds

References

Further reading

 Almirall, Leon V. Canines and Coyotes. Caldwell, Id.: The Caxton Printers, Ltd., 1941.
 Barret, Kay. Living with Deerhounds 
 Bell, Weston. The Scottish Deerhound. 1892. (Reprinted by Hoflin Publishing Inc., 4401 Sephyr St., Wheat Ridge, Colorado, U.S.A. 80003.)
 Benbow, Audrey. How To Raise and Train A Scottish Deerhound. Neptune City, N.J.: T.F.H.Publications, 1965, 1993.
 Blaze, Elzear and Byng Hall, Herbert The Sportsman and His Dog London: Darling 1850 
 Cassels, Kenneth. A Most Perfect Creature of Heaven: The Scottish Deerhound. K.A.H.Cassels, 1997.
 Crealock, Lt.-General Henry Hope. Deerstalking in the Highlands of Scotland. London: Longmans & Green, 1892.
 Cunliffe, Juliette. Deerhound. Dorking, Surrey, U.K.: Interpret Publishing, 2002.
 Cupples, George. Scotch Deerhounds and their Masters. Edinburgh: William Blackwood, 1892. (Reprinted in 1978 by Hoflin Publishing Inc.)
 Dalziel, Hugh. British Dogs – Their Varieties, History, Characteristics, Breeding, Management And Exhibition London: The Bazaar Office circa 1879 
 Grimble, Augustus. Deer-stalking London: Chapman & Hall 1886 
 Hartley, A.N. The Deerhound. 1986. (Available from the Scottish Deerhound Club of America and the Deerhound Club (U.K.))
 Heidenreich, Barbara. Your Scottish Deerhound Primer, Fern Hill, Ontario, 1989,1999,2005,2012.
 Macrae, Alexander. A Handbook of Deer-stalking Edinburgh: William Blackwood 1880 
 Scrope, William. The Art of Deer-stalking. London: John Murray 1839.
 Shaw, Vero. The Illustrated Book of the Dog. London: Cassell 1881 
 St. John, Charles. Sketches of the Wild Sports & Natural History of the Highlands London: John Murray 1878 
 Van Hummell: "The Deerhound", in The American Book of the Dog Editor George O. Shields. Chicago: Rand Mcnally 1891

External links

 How Deerhounds run: "coursing under rules" of blue mountain hare in the breed's terrain of origin

FCI breeds
Sighthounds
Dog breeds originating in Scotland
Vulnerable Native Breeds
Deer in Scotland